David Hall was an Irish Labour Party politician. He was elected to Dáil Éireann as a Labour Teachta Dála (TD) for the Meath constituency at the 1923 general election, and was re-elected at the June 1927 general election. He did not contest the September 1927 general election.

References

Year of birth missing
Year of death missing
Labour Party (Ireland) TDs
Members of the 4th Dáil
Members of the 5th Dáil
Politicians from County Meath